David Connolly (born 1977) is an Irish professional footballer.

David Connolly  may also refer to:

 David Connolly (skeleton racer) (born 1980), Irish skeleton racer
 David Connolly (translator) (born 1954), English-born Greek literary translator
 David Connolly (politician) (born 1939), Australian politician
David W. Connolly (born 1968), Canadian choreographer 
 Dave Connolly, see NHRA U.S. Nationals